Porky may refer to:

As a nickname
 Frank Biscan (1920-1959), Major League Baseball pitcher
 Gordon Brown (Canadian football) (born 1927), Canadian Football League retired player
 Porky Chedwick, Pittsburgh radio disk jockey of the 1950s and 1960s
 Edward "Porky" Cragg (1919-1943), American World War II fighter ace
 Dan Flynn (boxer) (1888-1946), American boxer
 Porky Freeman (1916-2001), American Western swing performer, bandleader, and songwriter
Rafael López Aliaga, Peruvian politician
 Paul Morgan (rugby league) (died 2001), Australian rugby league player and businessman
 Ed Oliver (golfer) (1916-1961), American golfer
 George Peckham, British record engineer
 Hal Reniff (1938-2004), Major League Baseball pitcher
 Alex Romeril (1882-1968), Canadian hockey and football player, and first coach of the Toronto Maple Leafs
 John Zancocchio (born 1958), New York mobster

Fictional characters
 Porky Pig, a character from Looney Tunes
 Porky, a character in Our Gang
 Porky, the title character of Porky's, a 1982 Canadian film
 Silvester "Porky" Broadway, a character from Lassie
 Porky Pine, a character in the Pogo comic strip by Walt Kelly
 Porky Minch, a character from the Mother video game series

Other uses
 Porky (novel), a 1983 novel by Deborah Moggach
 Porky (Stephanolepis auratus), a species of fish - see Stephanolepis
 Porky the Poet was a stage name used by the comedian Phil Jupitus early in his career

See also
 "Porkies", the Porcupine Mountains of Michigan
 Porky's, a 1981 sex comedy film

Lists of people by nickname